Bedfordshire County Council was the county council of the non-metropolitan county of Bedfordshire in England. It was established on 24 January 1889 and was abolished on 1 April 2009. The county council was based in Bedford.

In 1997 Luton Borough Council became a unitary authority and in 2009 the remaining county council was divided into two unitary authorities: Bedford Borough Council and Central Bedfordshire Council (formed from Mid Bedfordshire and South Bedfordshire District Councils).

History

Creation

Events that took place were:

The Local Government Act 1888 created County Councils to bring the delivery of local services under democratic control that were previously overseen by the Court of Quarter Sessions and bodies such as School Boards, Highways Boards and Poor Law Boards. The first elections for 64 members were held on 24 January 1889, with the first meeting held at Shire Hall (shared with the law courts), Bedford on 7 February 1889.

1888–1899
Events that took place were:
 Initial roles: Maintenance of 245 miles of main roads (except in towns) and the county bridges and, 
 Responsibility for paying for (but not directly controlling) the Poor Law Unions, the police and the Three Counties Lunatic Asylum and nominated committee members to them.
 Powers followed over weights and measures, explosives, river pollution, food and drugs, contagious diseases (animals) and licensing houses for stage plays.
 Budget £30,000

1889–1902
Events that took place were:

 1891: Technical Instruction Committee established.  
 1893: Appointment of part-time Medical Officer
 1898: Records Committee formed

1902–1919
Events that took place were:

 1902: Education Act gave control of all elementary schools (except in boroughs of Bedford and Luton) to the County Council
 May 1903: Education Committee formed. By 1903-4 there were 45 elementary evening schools leading to one school per year on average being built up to 1918. Council started assisting existing secondary schools and giving grants to and in exchange for a restricted number of free places.
 1903: Motor Car Act enabled the Council to collect motor vehicle registration fees and issue drivers’ licences
 1908: Licences for dogs and horse-drawn carriages introduced and administered by the council
 1908: Smallholdings and Allotments Act gave the Council the duty to provide allotments if 6 or more people wanted them. By 1918 nearly 6,000 acres (approx. 2400 hectares) were farmed. 
 1913: GH Fowler established the County Record Office in Shire Hall (first county record office in England)
 1914–18: Committees established for War Agriculture, War Pensions, War Emergency and Women's War Agriculture.

1919–1929
Events that took place were:

 1921: Adult education introduced
 1922:  Council's first female councillor, Amy Walmley elected
 1926: School meals introduced in Sharnbrook. National Hadrow Report on education recommendation for a three-tier education system for infants, juniors and seniors adopted in the county
 1924:  Service established

1929–1939
Events that took place were:

 1929 Local Government Act transferred powers and responsibilities to the Council from The Poor Law Unions, transferred roads maintained by District Councils gave powers to create an overall Regional Plan in conjunction with the district councils

1939–1949
Events that took place were:

 War Agriculture Committee ensured derelict land brought back to farming and more efficient use of existing farmland
 1944 Education Act created new three-tier education system of primary, secondary and further and gave Bedfordshire County Council power over all state schools (but delegated running of schools in Bedford and Luton to their established Borough Educations Departments)
 1947: Fire Service became a Council responsibility
 1948: Creation of NHS reduced Council's medical responsibilities to little more than the Ambulance Service. Council given oversight of children and welfare.
 1952: County Plan produced by County Planning Officer, E. Stearne supported 1937 Council report calling for a bypass of Bedford and Luton

1950–1974
Events that took place were:

 1969–1974: Fully comprehensive education system introduced by Bedfordshire County Council including alteration of school buildings, closures and a number of propose built schools
 1960 Home Helps and Chiropody Service established
 May 1963: County Council voted by 46 votes to 6 for a new purpose-built County Hall to be designed by Deputy County Architect, Douglas Chalk overseen by County Architect, John Barker
 By 1964 twelve new residential care homes for the elderly were opened
 Major building programmes led by ’s Department, building fire stations, ambulance stations, libraries, police stations, schools and made alterations to children’s homes. 
 July 1969:  Records Office and Library relocated to the Riverside Building at County Hall
 November 1969: Council staff moved into the new County Hall.
 October 1970: County Hall officially opened by the Duchess of Kent
 1974: Local Government Act 1972 led to creation of 3 new district councils replacing smaller urban and rural districts, the abolition of ‘county boroughs’ such as Luton County Borough and a new County Council of 83 members (later 73).

1979–1989
Events that took place were:

 1976: Creation of Bedfordshire College of Higher Education
 Various road schemes completed including sections of the Luton East Circular Road, Kempston Southern Bypass, Bromham Bypass and Ampthill Bypass
 1983–1987:  Council successfully lead campaign to prevent nuclear waste being dumped at Elstow Storage Depot
 1988: Bedfordshire House opened in as headquarters for County Council services in the south of the county
 1989 budget £337m. Main responsibilities: Education, Fire Service, Highways (inc.1,400 miles of road), Libraries, Planning, Police, Road Safety, Social Services, Trading Standards, Waste Disposal, Youth Employment.

1989–1999
Events that took place were:

 1992: Stagsden bypass opened at cost of £3.7m
 1996: Arlesey/Stotfold bypass opened at a cost of £12m
 1997: As a result of the 1994 Local Government Review Luton became a unitary authority (on its pre1974 boundaries) on 1 April.
 The County Council's Partnership Programme led to the outsourcing of a wide range of services such as highways maintenance and property (buildings and farms etc.) following the central government requirement for local services to be opened to the private sector through Compulsory Competitive Tendering.
 Greater independence given to schools through Local Management of Schools
 1999: Became the first county in the country to introduce the Leader and Cabinet system, overseen by an Executive Committee
 Bedfordshire County Council became a founding partner in the Marston Vale Community Forest (now Forest of Marston Vale) with Forest Centre and Millennium Country Park

1999–2009
Events that took place were:

 2000: Long-standing leader, Cllr Phillip Hendry appointed a CBE for services to local government including instigating the business services outsourcing partnership with Hyder Business Services (HBS) signed in June 2001 (intended to last 12 years) requiring them to deliver a customer contact centre, investment in council buildings and ICT systems and support services to schools.
 2002: National annual Comprehensive Performance Assessment (with star rating) introduced for councils to assess service delivery. Bedfordshire County Council initially rated ‘poor’ with zero stars.
 New style of leadership and management led to the introduction of the ‘Transforming Bedfordshire’ plan and greater consultation with the public regarding priorities.
 2005:  Following a review In August the Council terminated its contract with HBS and agreed a £7.7m pay-of which mainly covered the cost of works undertaken and products purchased for council services
 2004–2007: County Council progressively moved up to 3 stars in the Comprehensive Performance Assessment being judged a ‘good’ council ‘improving strongly by the Audit Commission with progress during that time mentioned in parliament. The Times newspaper described the Count Council as a “remarkable improver: one of the fastest improving authorities in local government history” and the Municipal Journal said it had achieved ‘Lazarus-style’ proportions. 
 2007–2008: Local Government Review considered proposals for replacing existing county and district councils in Bedfordshire with one county-wide unitary council or smaller unitaries based on individual and amalgamated districts. The Government announced that the County Council would be abolished in 2009.
 2008:  Ridgmont Bypass opened at cost of £15.5m 
 2009:  Council achieved top ratings in children's, environment, and cultural services as well as its use of resources. Final meeting of Bedfordshire County Council was on 26 March and services were transferred to Bedford Borough Council and Central Bedfordshire Council on 1 April 2009.

Coat of Arms
Bedfordshire County Council had its coat of arms created in 1951 as part of the Festival of Britain celebrations. The coat of arms became the symbol of the county being placed on many public buildings and signs. The council used the banner of arms as a flag until it was abolished in 2009. Description from heraldry-wiki.com states:

Official blazon 
Arms : Quarterly Or and Gules a Fess wavy barry way of four Argent and Azure surmounted by a Pale Sable charged with three Escallops of the third.

Crest : On a Wreath of the Colours issuant from a Wreath of Oak Or a Swan's Head and Neck proper.

Supporters : On the dexter side a Lion Gules and on the sinister side a Bull Or.

Motto: 'CONSTANT BE'

Origin/meaning 
The arms were officially granted on 12 April 1951.

The division of the field quarterly or and gules is derived from the arms of the Beauchamps, Constables of Bedford Castle, the leading family in the county after the Norman Conquest. The Beauchamp of 1215 was one of the promoters of Magna Carta, and their last male was killed at Evesham in 1265.

The wavy bar denotes the river Ouse. The pale charged with three escallops commemorates the services of the House of Russell to the State, the County and the County Council, and is taken from the arms of that family.

The crest is a swan's head and neck and again refers to the Ouse.

The lion supporter is taken from a similar supporter to the Russell coat of arms. The bull supporter stands for the importance of agriculture in the county.

The motto "Constant be" is taken from Bunyan's hymn: |"Who would true valour see, let him come hither, |One here will constant be, come wind, come weather"

References

 
Former county councils of England
History of Bedfordshire
1889 establishments in England
2009 disestablishments in England